Sorted is the second album by The Drones, released in 1999, some 22 years after its predecessor Further Temptations.

Track listing
"Sorted" – 3:21
"Johnny Go Home" (Remix) – 3:20
"Dirty Bastards" – 2:23
"Nightman" – 2:33
"Psychotic Woman" – 2:57
"American Pie" – 3:46
"The Phone" – 3:14
"Good Girl" – 2:46
"I'll Get Back to You" – 3:03
"I Don't Care" – 2:53
"Jon the Postman" – 2:50
"I Heard It through the Grapevine" – 3:24

References

1999 albums
The Drones (English band) albums